Lucy Gray (born December 2006) is a New Zealand climate change activist.

Biography 
Lucy Gray is a school student at Ao Tawhiti school in Christchurch and was previously at Cashmere High School. She is a national chairperson of School Strike 4 Climate activities, including marches for school students to join. Three took place in 2019, on 15 March (which was abandoned for safety reasons due to the Christchurch mosque shootings), 24 May, and again on 27 September. A fourth, indoor protest took place in May 2020, while New Zealand was in lockdown due to the COVID-19 pandemic.

In May 2019 Gray met with Prime Minister Jacinda Ardern to discuss the government's plans to manage the climate change crisis. She has spoken at the 2019 National Young Leaders Day, 2019 Festival For the Future, and at TEDx Youth@Christchurch. In early 2020 she was a reader at the 1.5 Degrees Live! event. She will be a keynote speaker at the online 2020-2021 Aotearoa New Zealand Sustainable Development Goals Summit.

Gray names Greta Thunberg, Swedish climate change activist, as one of her role models and inspirations. She is the author of "Rise up", a climate change protest anthem.

References

Living people
2006 births
Climate activists
New Zealand children
New Zealand women environmentalists
People from Christchurch
Child activists
Youth climate activists
People educated at Ao Tawhiti
People educated at Cashmere High School